Zhaira Costiniano (born November 30, 1995 in Manila, Philippines) is a Filipino figure skater. She qualified to the free skate at the 2012 Four Continents Championships in Colorado Springs, Colorado. She is the 2009 junior ladies Philippine national champion and the 2010 senior ladies Philippine national champion. NW Asian Weekly named Costiniano among the top ten Asian-American sports figures in 2010.

Costiniano became the youngest lady to win the Philippine senior ladies title at age 15. She is also the first lady to win the Philippine junior and senior national titles in consecutive years. Costiniano represented the Philippines at the Junior World Championship in 2010 and 2011. She was the flag bearer for the Philippines at the 2011 Asian Winter Games held in Kazakhstan and placed 7th at the event.

Programs

Competitive highlights

References

External links 

 

Filipino female single skaters
1995 births
Living people
Sportspeople from Manila
Figure skaters at the 2011 Asian Winter Games